Thelaira nigripes is a species of fly in the family Tachinidae first described by Carl Fredrik Fallén in 1817. It parasitizes moths such as Arctia caja by laying eggs in the larvae that eventually kill the host.

References

Diptera of Europe
Taxa named by Carl Fredrik Fallén
Dexiinae
Insects described in 1817